Abdul Majid Daryabadi (16 March 1892 – 6 January 1977) was an Islamic scholar, philosopher, writer, critic, researcher, journalist and exegete of the Quran in Indian subcontinent in the 20th century. He was as one of the most influential Indian Muslim scholar and was much concerned with modernism and comparative religions and orientalism in India. In his early life, he became sceptical of religion and called himself a "rationalist". For almost nine years, he remained away from religion but repented and became a devout Muslim. He was actively associated with the Khilafat Movement, Royal Asiatic Society, Aligarh Muslim University, Nadwatul Ulama, Darul Musannefin Shibli Academy and several other leading Islamic and literary organisations. He was disciple of Ashraf Ali Thanwi and Hussain Ahmed Madani.

Throughout his academic career he edited the Urdu weekly Sidq-e-Jaded, which was acclaimed in the Indo-Pak subcontinent for its inspiring message and stylistic features. He continued to edit the journal until his death. He had a unique style of writing which was expressive and tinged with humor and sarcasm. He was influenced by Ashraf Ali Thanwi to write a Tafsir and then he wrote a famous Tafsir in English first then in Urdu named Tafseer-e-Majidi. He wanted to purify the Muslims thinking to understand and implement true Islamic teachings and free from "foreign" and "un-Islamic" elements and to review the decision of previous scholars before blindly accepting them. In 1967, he got the Arabic Scholar Award from the Government of India. In 1975, the Aligarh Muslim University awarded him a Doctorate in Literature. He died in January 1977.

Life and family 
Abdul Majid Daryabadi is being well known and more famous by his birthplace Daryabad. Therefore, he has been called Daryabadi in relation to his birthplace, Daryabad. His father is Abdul Qadir (1848-1912) ibn Mufti Mazhar Karim Qudwai (d.1873) Ibn Shaykh Mukhdum Bakhsh. He was born on 16 March 1892 at Daryabad, a wellknown Indian town in Barabanki district, Uttar Pradesh, India. Therefore, popularly he was called Daryabadi with the name of his place of birth. He came from anoble Qidwai family. The name of his race is Qidwai or Qudwai in Arabic. It is one of the branches of Israelites. His topmost ancestor was a Chief Justice named Qadi Shykh Muizuddin. It was the time of tenth century; he came to India in the reign of Mahmud Ghaznawi (971-1030) with an unknown troop and settled at Ayodhya, district of Faizabad. He was called Qudwatul Ilm waddin and in general he was called Qadi Qidwah. He was contemporary of Mahmud Ghaznawi. Daryabadis ancestor Qadi Muizuddins graveyard is near Babri Masjid. Daryabadis family had a long-standing tradition of spiritual leadership. A number of his ancestors were leaders of Sufi Orders. His father was also a follower of Qadiriyya Sufi Order. His mother's name is Bibi NaSirun Nisa. She was also from Qudwai ancestry. Her father that means Daryabadis maternal grandfather was elder brother of Daryabadis grandfather Mufti Mazhar Karim Qudwai. So, his father married to his cousin. His maternal grandfather was the resident at Lucknow. Therefore, Lucknow became his second home. His father was also born in Lucknow. He was the youngest son of his family among five siblings. His father was the youngest son of his family too. While he wrote his autobiography named Aap Biti, he noticed that only one elder brother named Abdul Majid (d.1951) and one elder sister named Zarifunnisa (d.1945) were alive. Later his sister's name is changed into Bibi Sakina.

Education 
His first education started in 1895 at his home. In that time he was four years old, but he were looking five due to his health. He was brought up in a religious environment. He learnt Arabic and Persian at home. His father had a good command in Arabic and Persian language. Therefore, he read out the Quran and deferent books in Persian, like Gulistan, Bustan and Sikandarnamah, Kimiya-i-Saadat of Imam Ghazzali and Yusuf Zulaykha of Mullah Jami. Daryabadi also learnt Arabic language at that time. Then he was admitted to Sitapur High School. He continued his school education there up to class ten from 1902 to 1908. Therefore, he matriculated from Sitapur High School in 1908 with second division. At that time, this was Called Entrance. Then it was become Matriculation and then High School Certificate (HSC). He learnt Arabic language from Hakim Muhammad Zaki and Maulavi Azmatullah. His house tutor was Hakim Muhammad Ali Atahar Dihlawi. He learnt Urdu from Maulavi Muhammad Ismail Miritih and English from a Hindu teacher, whose name is unknown. The school was nearest to his house. Two Muslim teachers among the 10-12 teachers were in this school, Mirza Muhammad Zakir Lucknawi and Maulavi Sayyid Haydar Hussayn Lucknawi. Both of them were Shiah Muslims in faith. Daryabadi took Arabic with the advice of Mirza Muhammad Zaki and a famous teacher of Firinghi Mahal Maulavi Azmatullah. Therefore, Abdul Majid Daryabadi continued his primary education up to class ten at Sitapur High School. In July 1908, after passing the matriculation examination, he was admitted at Canning College, Lucknow in intermediate level. Later this college was become Lucknow University after 12 years in 1920. At that time, all colleges of Lucknow were under Allahabad University (estd. 1887). The subjects in his intermediate level were; Logic, History, Arabic and compulsory subject was English. He passed intermediate (HSC) with second division in 1910. Then he was admitted in B.A. (honours) in Philosophy at that college in 1910. The subjects in his BA (honours) were English (text), General English, Philosophy and Arabic. First two were compulsory. Than Metaphysics, Ethics and Psychology were included in three branches of Philosophy. He was very much interested in Psychology. Selective writings of Ibn Khaldun, Maqamat-i-Hariri, Maqamat-i-Badiuzzaman Hamadani, Mutanabbi and Abu Tamam were included in Arabic language and Arabic Literature. On April in 1912, he appeared in BA (honours) examination. Therefore, he went to Allahabad for appearing to BA final exam, under Allahabad University (estd. 1887). The result published on June in 1912 and he obtained second class in B.A. (honours). Therefore, he graduated in 1912. In that time, he exposed himself to the rationalist and an agnostic. He had a natural taste for Philosophy. However, during his time, there is no M.A. course in Philosophy except two Universities. One was Banaras Hindu University (estd. 1915) and other was Aligarh Muslim University (estd. 1920). Then he decided to go to Aligarh and got admitted in M.A. course in Philosophy. On March, in 1913 the first-year examination of MA was held, but he failed. Then he was admitted in St. Stephen's College, Delhi in 1913 to continue his MA in philosophy. However, he could not pursue his studies for long time and ought to stop his higher education midway due to his father's death in the time of performing his Haj in 1912. In that time, Daryabadi was 20 years old. He had none of his relatives to defray the expenses of his education. However, his father handed him over his father's intimate friend Raja Sahib Mahmud Abad before going for his pilgrimage. He had not come back home after completing his pilgrimage, because he died during his pilgrimage. In addition, meanwhile the Peoples Bank was become bankrupted. In this reason, the whole of his father's deposited money was lost. Therefore, he could not pursue his object. From this event and this situation, it was realized that perhaps none of his relatives or nearest persons were rich and wealthy to bear the expenditure of his studies. Then he entered the field of job. In 1918, he took to a study of Buddhism and Theosophy. Later, in his own words, he progressively became a Muslim under the influence of Ashraf Ali Thanwi, the famous Urdu poet Akbar Allahabadi. He was associated with Khilafat Conference at Lucknow in 1927 and was president of the Oudh Khilafat Committee.

Received the title 'Maulana' 
Abdul Majid Daryabadi has not educated from Madrasah education, but the Arabic language and literature were always text course in Daryabadis studies at Canning College, Lucknow. He passed from Canning College in 1912 with Arabic. In this why, he knew Arabic very well and he had good command in English and deep knowledge in Psychology, Philosophy and Logic. When he was a college student at the age of 15/16, he wrote two articles, first is named; Mahmud Ghaznavi and second is Ghadha-i Insani. Both the articles have been published at weekly magazine Wakil of Amritsar. Later the Wakil Book Agency had published his first two articles in the shape of booklet in 1910. The two articles are very much authentic and have literary values. After the evaluation of these two articles, Wakil Book Agency had given him a title "Mawlana" and sent a letter to him. After that they had written first his name Maulana Abdul Majid Daryabadiin spite of his name Abdul Majid Daryabadi and printed the name of writer Mawlana Abdul Majid Daryabadi on the cover page of the booklet, while he was a college student. However, the title "Maulana", he did not accept because at that time he became agnostic and rationalist that means the duration of his rationalism from 1909 to 1918. In that time he wrote and introduced himself Mr. Abdul Majid rather than Mawlana. However, the time of his childhood and youth was in Islam. After that time, he came back to Islam by the influence of Haji Warith Ali Shah, Akbar Ilah Abadi, Maulana Muhammad Ali Jawhar and Rishi Bahgwan Das. They were the influential persons who had done appreciable work to come back him to Islam. In a result, he has contributed the Muslim communuty by the Tafsir Literature.

Marriage 
He married Aftun Nisa on 2 June 1916, the daughter of former magistrate Shaykh Yusufuz-Zaman. In October 1930 he had second marriage but it had not been settled. It had been separated with divorce. He had been stayed with his first wife Aftun Nisa up to end of their conjugal life. All of his daughters and sons (died in early childhood) were born by his first wife.

Career

Writer 
After stopping his higher study, he entered the field of Journalism. First he worked at Udh Panch (pub.1877, Lucknow), then at Al-Hilal (pub.1912, Kalkata), Jamindar (pub.1912, Lahore), Hamdard (pub. 1913, Delhi). Then he started a weekly magazine Sach from Lucknow in 1925 and he was an editor of it. It had been continued up to 1933. Then in 1933, he stopped this weekly in due to involve deeply in writing an English translation and commentary of the Quran. Then in 1935, he changed this weekly into Sidq, then he finally changed it into Sidq-e-Jadid in 1950 and he was an editor of it until his death in 1977. Now, it has been edited and published from Lucknow by his son in law and his nephew Hakim Abdul Qawi Daryabadi. In that time Abdul Majid Daryabadi became a prolific and a famous writer and an eminent journalist by his writings of unique style and editing the weekly magazine Sidq-e-Jadid. Gradually he became an eminent Islamic scholar, commentator of the Quran, renowned Journalist and writer of Urdu literature with a distinctive writing style. He published sixty big and small works besides some poems and ghazals between 1914 and 1919 and a drama also. A good number of his articles also appeared in the Urdu and English journals of his day. He also literary articles to the prestigious Urdu journals like Ma'arifof Azamgarh, Al-Nazir and Hamdam of Lucknow and Hamdard of Delhi. Besides he was the member of Darul MuSannifin Shibli Academy, Azamgarh, later he headed its Managing Committee. He had also associated with the Royal Asiatic Society, London, Hindustani Academy, Court of the Muslim University, Aligarh, Khilafat Committee and the Nadwatul Ulama of Lucknow. However, his commentaries on the Quran in Urdu and English marked him out a place among the notable scholars of the modern age. He wrote more than fifty books in different subjects of Islam except the exegesis of the Quran.

Translator of Osmania University 
Abdul Majid Daryabadi was a prolific writer, journalist, a Mawlana and a successful interpreter of the Quran. He obtained high position among the Mufassirun. He had a nearest relationship with the previous government of Hydrabad. So, he had been appointed as a translator of the Department of Translation, Osmania University, Hydrabad. He had served as a Translator of Philosophy and Logic, Osmania University from 1 September 1917 to 31 July 1918, in total eleven months. The Government of Hydrabad published his name in the list of scholars after he left the job. It was established after the end of the Government of Hydrabad. Besides, of his job, the Government of Hydrabad has also given him wealth to publish his written books. He was given 125 Rupi per month as pension. He was associated for some time with the editorial board of The Modern Review and The Al-Maarif. His earliest essays published in 1909 as pamphlets were Ghaza-i Insani (Humans food) and Mahmud Ghaznavi. They were followed by Falsafa-i Jazbat and Falsafa-i Ijtima, published by Anjuman-i Taraqqi-i Urdu. These books introduce us to his early rationalist and agnostic environment.

Islamic philosopher and a Mufassir 
After reverted to Islam, he made friends with the devout Muslims like Akbar Allahabadi, Mohammad Ali Jauhar, Hussain Ahmed Madani and Ashraf Ali Thanwi. Therefore, his life had turned a full circle and he emerged as a devout Muslim under their influence and went on to become a philosopher of Islam and a Mufassir (interpreter) of the Quran. Daryabadi was influenced by Ashraf Ali Thanawi to write a tafsir on comparative religion. Then he started to write a tafsir in English first, later in Urdu, named Tafsir-ul-Quran: Translation and Commentary of the Holy Quran in English and Al-Quran al-Hakim in Urdu. In the both of his tafsir, he quoted from Bible, New Testament, Old Testament and Jewish Encyclopedia and compared to other religious books and religions to establish that the Islam is the best of all. He also quoted in his tafsir from other famous and recognized Arabic tafasir and discussed in the light of modern concept. It had been written during the Second World War as great as others in that time and until nowadays. He devoted his whole life writing and to the cause of Islam and published scores of books and articles in both English and Urdu, which brought him out the excellence of Islam. His tafsir helps Muslims to derive away all the doubts and make them intellectual to war against the western critics and criticisms of opponent and satisfied to find a satisfactory solution of the many questions. He wrote many basic books in Islamic subjects, like Islamic Philosophy, Sufism, Biography of Islamic personalities, Different Dimension of interpretation of the Quran that is called tafsir literature. At that time, he became a prolific and a famous writer by his own writings of unique style. He became an eminent scholar, commentator of the Holy Quran, journalist and a writer of Urdu literature with his distinctive writing style. He wrote many books on Philosophy and Psychology. In that time, he became a Philosopher in modern concept.

Oath of Allegiance 
In his family, the education and the meta-physical practice had been going on. His family was an educated and devoted to Islam. When Daryabadi came back to Islam from atheism and concentrated to the knowledge of Islam, then, in that time, he attracted to Sufism. He was come from a saint family. In a result, they went to the different graves of Sufis and Khanqas. In that time, he felt himself to need an effective guide for his activities. First, he decided to take an oath of allegiance on Mohammad Ali Jauhar. Then he decided to take oath of allegiance from Ashraf Ali Thanwi in 1928. Finally, he took oath of allegiance on the hand of Hussain Ahmed Madani with the permission of Ashraf Ali Thanawi. Professor Tahir Mahmud, Department of Law, University of Delhi said, "Hakim al-Ummat Mawlana Ashraf Ali Thanawi was a spiritual teacher of my father Sayyid Mahmud Hasan Wakil and Abdul Majid Daryabadi. He has written a book in the subject stated, named, "Murshid ki talash" (it means, to look for a spiritual Islamic guide to take true path of almighty Allah."

Awards 
In 1966 AC, he got the Arabic Scholar Award from the Government of India. In 1976, Aligarh Muslim University has awarded him a Doctorate in Literature. He received the award from the hand of Fakhruddin Ali Ahmed (1905-1977), Chancellor of the country, India. He was granted a lifetime-pension from Hyderabad State in recognition to his services to the Urdu Literature.

Death 
Abdul Majid Daryabadi was sick long time at Khatun Manzil of Lucknow. Here, the people were coming and crowd was continuing to meet him from the different type of the people. Specially, Abul Hasan Ali Hasani Nadwi, Professors of Darul Uloom Nadwatul Ulama met him frequently. Last time Muhammad Tayyib Qasmi, Principal of Darul Uloom Deoband and had met him, then after a day of his meeting he died on 6 January 1977 at 4:30 am at Khatun Manzil, Lucknow. Due to his last will, his first Namaz-e-Janazah was guided by Abul Hasan Ali Nadwi in a huge gathering at Nadwatul Ulama of Lucknow. Then he brought out to his father's home Daryabad. There was organized his second Namaz-e-Janazah, guided by Hafiz Gulam Nabi after the prayer of Maghrib in a huge crowd also, and then he buried adjacent to the graveyard of his forefather Makhdum Abkash. It was the graveyard of his father's family. He was 85 at the time of his death.

Personal life 
Khan Bahadur Sheikh Masood-uz-Zaman his brother-in law, was a member of the Legislative Council, the upper house of legislature for the United Provinces under British Raj. He would be the last elected deputy president of the council before it was dissolved. His sister was married to Nawab Nazir Yar Jung of Hyderabad state, a judge of the Hyderabad High Court. His niece (Nazir Yar Jung's daughter), was Hamida Habibullah, wife of General Enaith Habibullah and mother of Wajahat Habibullah of Saidanpur taluqa in Awadh. His son-in law, Hakeem Abdul Qavi Daryabadi (1917–1992), was a reputed Urdu Journalist, His son-in law and nephew, Muhammad Hashim Kidwai (1921–2017), was an accomplished author, academician and MP and AMU faculty. His grandsons are also well known academicians. Saleem Kidwai, is a professor of political science in Jawaharlal Nehru University. Abdur Raheem Kidwai, is a professor of English at the Aligarh Muslim University and a well-known author of many works on the Qur'an and Islam. Shafey Kidwai, is a recipient of Sahitya Akademi Award for Urdu and Iqbal Samman awardee, well-known bilingual critic and Professor of Mass Communication at the Aligarh Muslim University. Rasheed Kidwai, is a well-known political analyst, journalist and author. Nafay Kidwai (1958–2014), was a well known columnist and journalist who got UP Urdu Academy's highest award.

Views and thoughts

Inclination into dubiousness and disbelief 
Abdul Majid Daryabadi was from a noble family. His primary education was in a religious environment. His father was a pious Muslim. However, from his College life, he met the rationalist school of the west and became a rationalist and an agnostic. Gradually suspicion and disbelief started in his thought and faith. He read out the books of Atheists and Orientalists, like famous Greek philosophers; Plato, Aristotle, Socrates and Dicard etc. He was specially zeal of Bacon, Hume, Locke, Mill, Baikal, Spenser, Huxley, Darwin, William James etc. The Book of Psychology by William James was included in his course. He already read out the Principles of Psychology of William James. In this reason, his Islamic belief became convulsed. Then, he converted into Atheism and focused himself as an Atheist among the Muslims. 20th century was the time of freethinking and rationalism. In this condition, in 1910AC, while he filled up his form of intermediate final examination, he wrote Rationalist in spite of the word Muslim in the option of religion. In that time, he felt shame to introduce himself as a Muslim. In addition, at the period of college life, he wrote many books in Philosophy. He focused rationalistic thoughts and western philosophical thoughts in those books. However, after returning to Islam he felt shame himself about his rationalistic writings. About his suspicion, the famous Urdu poet Akbar Alahabadi said, "Changing of teaching will change the mind."

Period of rationalism 
Daryabadi brought up in a religious environment. However, the environment of his school influenced him to become a rationalist. He realized and felt shame about the deprived period from the light of the revealed knowledge of his life. The period is approximately ten years, from 1909 AC to 1918 AC of his important young life. He was a rationalist and an agnostic, but a Muslim by name, not in practicing Muslim. In the contrary, he supported having beef, writing and discussion about Islam. In Daryabadis memoirs he wrote, "Perhaps on October in 1911, a big conference was organized at Lucknow. Great speakers and Missionaries gathered there. Famous debater Dr. Zuemer was present there, who was good in Arabic like English. I went there to meet Dr. Zuemer with his friend Abdul Bari Nadvi. Discussion started, father of Church asked on Islam insulting. Nadwi answered in Arabic, but I answered in English in favour of Islam.

Return to Islam 
In 1918, he took to a study of Buddhism and Theosophy. Later, he became a Muslim under the influence of Ashraf Ali Thanawi (1863-1943). In addition, he has been influenced by renowned Indian writers and scholars; Sibli Numani (1857-1914), a famous Urdu poet Akbar Alahabadi (1846-1921), Muhammad Ali Jawhar (1878-1931), Abdul Bari Nadawi (1886-1976), Sulayman Nadawi (1884-1953), Bagwan Das (Banaras), and Gandhi (1869-1948). He wrote about his disbelieving life and turning point to Islam in his Muasirin (contemporaries) that "It was 1909AC through reading English books written by agnostics, I had turned from a good believer to a heretic … My apostasy has been continued till 1918AC… At that time, I read the English Quran Commentary by Muhammad Ali of Lahore. It convinced me that the Quran is no collection of hearsay stories, but a collection of deep and sublime truths, and if it was not heavenly, it was almost heavenly."

He was inspired and influences spiritually by Abdul Ahad Kasmundawi, Abid Husayn Fatehpuri and Husayn Ahmad Madani (to take the oath of allegiance on him), Iqbal, Haji Muhammad Safi Bajnuri (d.1951 at Makka). From his memoirs he wrote about famous poet Akbar Alahabadi, "One day he told me that why I had Arabic in my college course? Have I any relation to! I replied him that now I have no time to read and write on it. He replied me that the literary status of the Quran is being recognized to the people of Europe, he heard that the last fifteen Para of the Quran are included in the course of literature in Garman University. He advised me that to leave it and try to understand it and I might have relation to the Quran and whatever I like the part of the Quran to read daily. This was his part of Tabligh."

Once upon a time Daryabadi praised about a famous realistic writer and psychologist Willium Zamj and a philosopher Mill in front of Akbar Alahabadi. Daryabadi said, "He is not at present physically alive, but he is present in the whole world. In all languages, Mill was the greatest person. Akbar Alahabadi replied with smiling, "write down about Mill on a paper and put date on today. Ten years later, I will ask you about your praise of Mill." No ten but after three years Daryabadi became free from his past thought. Then he returned to Islam as a complete Muslim. After returning into Islam, he felt shame during of his life of rationalism and writings in that time.

Daryabadi wrote in Muasirin, "One day when I became a Muslim de novo and a guest of Akbar Alahabadi, then the first time I joined with him at Juhr prayer. He became happy, prayed to Allah for me,and told that your late father will be happy by the Angles to hear the news of your prayer.

Abdul Majid Daryabadi went through a critical phase of communist ideals in his life and a time came when he was about to indulge himself with the Bhagwad Gita. Meanwhile, a friend suggested him that he should try to study the Mathnawi of Mawlana Jalaluddin Rumi. After reading Mathnawi, his inner world was radically changed. Then he commented on that if he were to die then and on being questioned by the angels about his din, he would answer them with the reference of the Mathnawi that his din complied as mentioned in the book and he knew no further, then he was deeply connected with Ashraf Ali Thanawi and Qari Tayyab. Later from his contemporaries like Abdul Bari Nadwi and Manazir Ahsan Gilani.

His doctrine (Mazhab) 
He was the follower of Imam Abu Hanifahs mode of life that means his doctrine was Mazhab (school of thoughts) of Hanafi. There are four schools of thoughts (Mazahib) in Islam. Those are recognized by Ahl al-Sunnah wal Jamaah. The followers of one of these four Mazahib are included in Ahl al-Sunnah wal Jamaah. He has interpreted in whole of his tafsir in the light of Hanafi School of thoughts and denoted the acceptance and difference of the Hanafi School of thoughts. He established the Hanafi School of thoughts and flourished as the best one.

His consciousness in politics 
He was involved in the movement against English rulers. His grandfather was jailed of nine years for the movement against English rulers in 1857. When the demand of freedom of India was waving, his thinking was changed and inclined to the Congress. In 1909, published Al-Hilal, edited by Abul Kalam Azad. In that time, the weekly Muslim Gusset, was published, patronized by Shibli Numani (1857-1914). The writings of these dailies and weeklies were printed in favour of the movement of freedom of India. He joined in the seating of the movement of freedom with curiosity in Lucknow. His curiosity in politics was run from 1913 to 1916. In December 1916, the annual meeting of Congress was organized tumultuously in Lucknow. He joined here with simple amusement and just looking the outside and inside of the meeting. He was related to Muhammad Alis English journal Comrade and Urdu journal Hamdard. He read out his writings with interest. He sent some translations of English articles on the topic of political situation. Those were in critical discussions on the method of politics. In 1917, English rulers arrested some cosmopolitan persons due to the movement against the state. In this reason he involved in politics with a feelings of duty of the nation. In 1919, the meetings of the Khilafat Movement were arranged and processions were run in many places. He was inclined into Gandhi (1869-1948) and Muhammad Ali (1878-1931). He joined in these meetings. He got an opportunity to meet Gandhi in 1922, in the annual function of Khaja Ajmiri (1141-1236). In that time, Muhammad Ali (1878-1931) was in jail. After released on August or September in 1923, he met him at Bhuwali. Then, on December in 1923, he was elected as president of the Congress, Daryabadi went to Aligarh and he translated the other speech of president into Urdu. In 1931, after the death of Muhammad Ali, he detached himself from political activities, he devoted in journalism and writing books in Islam. In this reason the younger brother of Muhammad Ali, Shawkat Ali sent to him a letter with comment and requested him to come back to the political activities and organize the movement against the British Rules to established the rights of Muslims.

Finality of Prophet Hoods 
According to the Quran, Prophet Muhammad is the last prophet of Allah. A number of the Prophetic traditions also support this Quranic viewpoint but some false prophets appeared during last fifteen centuries among the Muslims. Daryabadi has not accepted any possibility of revelation after Prophet of Islam. A person claimed to be an apostolic prophet in the Punjab during colonial rule. Daryabadi thought it necessary to emphasis the belief in the finality of prophet hood and rejected any claim for the office of prophet hood after the last Apostle of Allah, Muhammad. He has discussed Musaylmah, the Liar and his defeat during the caliphate of the first Caliph Abu Bakr who was ultimately assassinated by his army. Daryabadi has refuted the false prophet of the Punjab vehemently. Commenting on the verse 5:3 he observes; This verse is indicated a clear argument for the Prophet as the last Prophet, because the religion has been finalized, perfect, true and completed and there is no room for changing in its injunction, which prevented the need of any new prophet. Allah has chosen for whole human in the world Islam as religion. So, he has interpreted in favour of this verse that completion of religion that means the finality of the Prophet. He strongly expressed in interpretation on the verse 33:40 that "closing the long line of apostles. He is not a prophet, but the Final Prophet and The last of the prophets".

Works and contribution 
Daryabadi wrote more than fifty books on different subjects of Islam and on Philosophy of Islam and on Psychology. Some of his books are in size of booklet. However, his writings are authentic, attractive, rational and deep most. First, he started to work as a journalist. He worked in Udh Panch (estd. 1877, Lucknow), Al-Hilal (estd. 1912, Kalkata), Jamindar (estd. 1912, Lahore), Hamdard (estd. 1913, Delhi) and worked as an editor of a weekly newspaper Sach (estd. 1925, Lucknow) and then it became Sidq and then Sidq-i-Jadid to the end of his life. He contributed literary articles to prestigious Urdu journals Ma'arif of Azamgarh, Al-Nazir and Hamdam of Lucknow and Hamdard of Delhi. Besides he was the member of Darul Musannefin Shibli Academy of Azamgarh, later he became the head of its Managing Committee. He also associated with the Royal Asiatic Society London, Hindustani Academy, Court of the Muslim University Aligarh, Khilafat Committee and the Nadwatul Ulama of Lucknow. Then he became a prolific writer, Islamic scholar and a successful interpreter of the Quran in English and in Urdu. His commentaries on the Quran in Urdu and in English have marked out a place for him among the notable scholars of the modern age. His writings are divided into many subjects, discussed under the title. He was a versatile writer in modern era, especially in this subcontinent. They are all in below:

Quranic sciences

Tafsir-ul-Quran:Translation and Commentary of the Holy Quran 
Top of the cover page of this tafsir has been written Tafsir-i Majidi by the publisher. Daryabadi wrote this tafsir in English first by the influence of Sirajul Haq Machly Shahry. He knew very much about Daryabadis knowledge, personalities and good command in the English language. It had been published by Darul Ishaat, Urdu Bazar, Karachi, Pakistan in four volumes in 1991. The author himself wrote the Preface on December in 1941. The author observed that to translate the Quran is very difficult. So, he advised to the translators to follow the six main points and various subpoints to translate the holy Quran into English. Because he observed some problems to translate into English and he told that, there is no language in the world as well as Arabic. The Introduction was written by Abul Hasan Ali Hasani Nadwi on 16 August 1981. The first volume had been started from surah al-Fatihah to surah al-Maidah of 82 verses. It is a brief exegesis of the Quran but a highly appreciated, admired, accepted and recommended tafsir to all.

Al-Quran Al-Hakim 
Written in Urdu, this is a tafsir of complete set in one vol., published by Taj Company Limited, Lahore and Karachi, Pakistan in 1952. The pages are 1215 in total. The author himself has written a Preface of this tafsir. He has cited a list of books those he has associated from, like Arabic and Urdu exegesis and the dictionaries in Arabic and in Urdu. He has written that he has associated more from Bayan al-Quran of Ashraf Ali Thanawi. It has highly been recommended to all of the Urdu speaking Muslims in India and Pakistan as well as his tafsir in English.

Tafsir-i-Quran: Tafsir-i Majidi 

It is his tafsir, written in Urdu, vol.1-3, not completed, published by MajliS-i-Nashriyat-i-Quran, Karachi, Pakistan in 1998. after his death. It is as same as his Urdu tafsir Al-Quran al-Hakim, which is a complete set in one volume, but it has not been completed. It has been printed 1-3 volumes. However, title of the tafsir is different on cover page of this book.

The Glorious Quran 
It is an abridged version of his tafsir named Tafsir ul-Quran, published from Lucknow, Academy of Islamic Research and Publication, 4 volumes: 1981–85.

Ard Al-Quran 
Published by Naimur Rahman Siddiqui, Khatun Manjil, Haydar Mirza Road, Lucknow, India. There are informations about the places mentioned in the Quran.

Shakhsiyat-I Quran 
Published by Naimur Rahman Siddiqui, Khatun Manjil, Haydar Mirza Road, Lucknow, India. There are informations about the persons mentioned in the Quran.

Alam al-Quran 

Published by Sidq-i-Jadid Book Agency, Lucknow, India.

Al-Hywanat Fi Al-Quran or Hywanat-IQur’ani 
Published by Majlis-i-Nashriat-iIslam, Karachi, Pakistan, and Edition: 2006. He has written this book after finishing his tafsir
in English and in Urdu. He has mentioned in the Preface of this book that "After finishing my tafsir in English and in Urdu I realised that needed another contribution to the study of Quran. In this why this book has been written about the animals informations mentioned in the Quran. He has discussed about the animals those are discussed in the Quran and discussed their characteristics, activities and their names derived from the languages and related to. He has discussed them linguistically and alphabetically. First of all he has written the meaning of the word, then the name of Surah and number of the verses used in the Quran, and then he has written the purpose of the discussion in the Quran. Then he has written their characteristics. There are 176 words have been included for discussion in this book. The author has also written The Preface of this book on 27 June 1954.

Bashriyat-i Anbiyah 
Published by Maktabah Islam, Lucknow. There are thirteen chapters and fore worded by Hakim Abdul Qawi daryabadi, editor of Sidq Jadid and The Preface was written by the Author himself. He has focused in the book that Allah sent his apostle as a human not an Angel. He has established it in the light of Quran.  He has written this book after completion of his tafsir in English and in Urdu. First edition has been published by Sidq Jadid book agency in 1959 or 1960. He has written this book to purify the faith of people upon oneness of Allah (Tawhid). He has focused in the book that the apostles were not God they were selected from human society, but they were the best of all. It was written in proper time when the faith of Muslim people was going to be wrong. In that time, Daryabadi wanted to save the faith of Muslim people upon Allah.

Qasas Wa-Masail 
Published by Islamic Publishers, Lucknow, India.

Mashkilat Al-Quran 
Published by Islamic Research Foundation, Madras, India.

Islamic philosophy

Sachchi Bati (True speech) 
Published by Nafis Academy, Kimbal Road, Karachi. Second edition, 1982. The total pages of this book are 312. This book is a compilation of short editorial notes published in his weekly Sach. There are 130 notes compiled with different titles.

Murshid-Ki Talash 
It means, to look for a guide to almighty Allah, published by Khatun Manjil, Haydar Mirza Road, Gulaganj, Lucknow, India. He has written in this topic for becoming near to almighty Allah with a good Islamic guide. However, nowadays activities of Islamic guide are not legal obviously illegal. He said, if a Muslim needs to control him in the right way to almighty Allah, he has to follow a good Islamic guide. He argued that an Islamic spiritual guide must be qualified to develop and purify the inner world of the human being. All companies of the Prophet were guided by the Prophet Muhammad.

Tamaddun-I Islam Ki Kahani 
Published by Tanjim-i Islahi Muashirah, Lucknow.

Qatli Masyh-Sy-Ihud Ki Buriyat 
Published by Islami Mission. Sunnat Nagar, Lahore, Pakistan. He has discussed about the death of son of Maryam, Isa. He proved in this book that the ill activities of Israilits killing the Prophet of almighty Allah.

Zikr-I Rasul 
Published by Madani Kutub Khanah, Karachi, Pakistan. The total pages of this book are 136. This is a compilation of various topics on the life of the Prophet Muhammad. It is not a continuation of the Prophets life.

Mashwary Awr Gujarishi 
Published by al-Ilm Publishers, Lucknow.

Tasawuf-I Islam 
Published by Nim Book Dipu, Lucknow; Daru Matbaa Maarif, Azamgar, 1929. There are eight chapters in this book. In this book, he has discussed on written books by some famous Islamic philosophers and scholars on Tasawuf. In the first chapter, he has analyzed the Arabic book on Tasawuf, named; Kitab al-Luma„if-alTasawuf by Shaykh Abu Nasar Siraj (b.378AH). It is the oldest book on Tasawuf in Arabic and translated in Urdu. In the second chapter, he has discussed the famous Persian book, named; Kashf al- Mahjub [Revelation of the Veiled] by Shykh Abul Hassan Ali Ibn Uthman Hujwiri Ghaznawi (b. 470AH/990AC). He is as famous as called Data Ganj Bakhsh (d.552A H/1072AC). It is the oldest book on Tasawuf in Persian language. In the third chapter, he has discussed the book, named; Risala-i Qushairiah by Imam Abul Qasimal-Qushari (376-465AH). It is also the oldest one on Tasawuf that means Sufism in Islam. In the fourth chapter, he has discussed the book, named; Fatuh al-Gayb by Shykh Mahiuddin Abdul Quadir Jilani Mahbub-i Subhani (471-561AH). In the fifth chapter, he has discussed the book, named; Awarif al-Maarif by Shykh Shahab Uddin Suhrawardi (531-632AH). In the sixth chapter, he has discussed on the book, named; Fawaid al-Fuwad by Khajah Nizam Uddin Mahbub Ilahi (12381325AC). In the seventh chapter, he has discussed on the book named; Mantaq al-Tayr by Shykh Farid Uddin Attar (513627AH). He was a famous Persian Muslim Sufi in Islam and a mystic poet and a theoretician of Sufism. In the eighth and the last chapter, he has discussed on the book, named; Lawaih by Mawlana Jami (718AH/1414AC-898AH/ 1492AC), his actual name is Nuruddin Abdur Rahman Jami, he was prolific scholar and writer of mystical Sufi literature. Abdul Majid Daryabadi has tried to establish that Islam and Tasawuf are correlated each other. One is not separated from other. Above those were Sufi saints, they practiced Sufism in the light of Islam.

Philosophy and psychology

Ghaja-I Insani 
Published by Wakil Bek Trading Agency, Omitsar: 1910. It had been written while he was a student of intermediate at Canning College. It has been taken references in medical sciences, especially in anatomical sciences. In this book, he had discussed about the organs of human body. It was printed as a booklet in 1910. It was his second book in his early life.

Falsafa-I Jadhbat 
Published by Anjuman-i-Traqqi-i-Urdu, Delhi. He wrote this book on philosophy in 1913, while he was a student of BA. It was published first in 1914 AC in Urdu, then in 1919 AC, then in 1930 AC. It was with 100 pages. Then it was published by Matba-i Institute, Aligarh in 1920AC. It was with 264 pages. It is a famous book in philosophy. This reflects his philosophical thoughts. He took help from 10 or 12 books in English.

Falsafa-I Ijtima 
Published by Anjuman-i-Traqqi-e-Urdu, Delhi.

Falsafa Ki TaLim Guzashtah Awr Mawjudah 
Published by al-Najir Book Agency, Lucknow. Falsafayanah Madamin, Published by al-Najir Book Agency, Lucknow.

Mubadi-I Falsafah 
It was the preliminary book of philosophy, Vol.1, published by Matba Malaria Press, Azamgardh: 1931. The total pages of this book are 185. There are six chapters included in this book.

Mubadi-I Falsafah 
It was the preliminary book of philosophy, Vol. 2, published by Matba Maarif Press, Azamgardh: 1934.The total pages of this book are 151. There are seven chapters included in this book.

Ham Ap (Popular Psychology) 
Published by Hindustani Academy, Alahabad. Faraidh Wa-Din, Published by Nul Kishur Book Dipu, Lucknow. It was written by the advice of his college friend. It is a learning booklet and published as an article, named; Ik Khadim-i-Talim. Dr. Akhlaqur Rahman Qidwayi said that Abdul Majid Daryabadis philosophical thought is relevant even today. He hoped that both the country and the community would continue to be benefited from his views and writings. The Psychology of Leadership, It was printed by a famous publisher T. Fisher Unwin, London (UK) in 1915 AC. At that time, the Psychology was a branch of Philosophy; later it has become science. Therefore, he wrote this book on Psychology. It is his famous book on Psychology.

J S Mill: A Bibliographical Sketch with the Critical Review of Some of His Writings 
This book was written on J S Mill, a great western philosopher. He was influenced by J S Mills thought. Therefore, he read out his all writings deeply and wrote this small book on him. Above those books were written during his rationalistic period. He wrote many books in philosophy before he returned to Islam. After returning to Islam, he felt shame about his rationalistic writings above those books and wanted to wipe the list of those books up from his memory. He has focused rationalistic thoughts and western philosophical thoughts in those books.

Autobiography and biography

Siratun Nababiyy Quran Ki Rushni Mye 
Karachi: Siddiqi House, 1958AC/1378AH. He has expressed his deepest love to the Prophet Muhammad. Total pages of this book are 264. It has been written a short biography of the Prophet Muhammad in the light of the Holy Quran.

Ap Biti 
Published by Maktabah Firdaws, Mukarram Nagar, Lucknow: 1978AC. It is a book of autobiography. The total pages of this book are 402.

Chanda Sawanih Tahriri  
Published by Abdul Majid Daryabadi Academy, Lucknow.

Hakimul Ummat 
Published by Maktaba Madaniyah, Urdu Bazar, and Lahore, Pakistan. This book has been written on the biography of Ashraf Ali Thanawi (1863-1943AC). He was Daryabadis spiritual guide. He has written the life of Ashraf Ali Thanawi from 1927-1943AC. The total pages are 547.

Muhammad Ali 
Published by Sidq Foundation, Lucknow, India. The total pages of this book are 672. This book has been written on the biography of Mawlana Muhammad „Ali Jawhar (1878-1931AC). He was Daryabadi‟s political guide and a great leader of Indian Muslim. Daryabadi has written his life from 1912 to 1930.

Mahmud Ghaznawi 
Published by Wakil Book Trading Agency, Amritsar, India. It was his first book in his early writing life.

MuAsirin 
Published by Idara-iInsha-i-Majidi, Rabindra Sarani, and Kolkata, India. It is a biographical book of contemporary persons. Forty three persons are there elder to him, twenty nine persons are as old as to him and eight persons are younger to him.

Wafiyat-I Majidi 
Published by Idara-i-Insha-iMajidi, Rabindra Sarani, and Kolkata: 2002AC, India. It is a compilation of selected sixty two articles of hundreds from his weekly Sidq and Sidq-e-Jadid. There are 288 pages in this book. The persons are from different categories. First chapter was written for ten persons of his family; like his mother, elder brother, elder sister, wife and relatives. Second chapter was written for twelve persons of respected Ulama and persons of Sufi order. Third chapter was written for sixteen personalities from political leaders. Fourth chapter was written for fourteen personalities, those were from the famous poets, literati and journalists. Fifth chapter was written for four personalities, who were Doctorates and physicians. Then the sixth and last chapter was written for seven personalities, who were from different field.

Akbar Namah 
Published by Idara-iInsha-i-Majidi, Rabindra Sarani, Kolkata, India:2008AC/1429AH. This is the book of biography of famous Indian Urdu poet Akbar Alahabadi. The total pages of this book are 311. There are sixteen chapters included in this book.

Travels

Safar-I Hijaz 
Published by Idara-iInsha-i-Majidi, Rabindra Sarani, and Kolkata, India. This book has been written on his traveling to Hijaz for pilgrimage.

Sayahat-I Majidi 
Published by Sidq Foundation, Khatun Manjil, Haydar Mirza Road, Lucknow: 2006. It is a book on traveling into many places. There are eleven places of India he traveled; Mumbai, Bihar, Bhopal, Hyderabad, Delhi, Kolkata, Madras, Aligarh, and Agra.It are the first chapter of this book. There are 360 pages and 15 topics in this book. He also traveled to Pakistan and Lahore for two weeks and a half. In this purpose, he has written a book.

Mubarak Safar 
Published by Sidqi-Jadid book Agency, Lucknow, India. Another name is two weeks and a half in Pakistan.

Legacy 

Daryabadi wrote an autobiography in 1978 named Aap Biti. Abdul Qavi Desnavi published a special number on Daryabadi in Lucknow edition of Naya Daur. He also published a review on Daryabadi in Maasreen published in Sahir Bombay Vol. 51 – No. 7 in 1980. In 2008 Md. Shams Alam a research scholar from the Department of Arabic, Persian and Urdu of University of Madras published a research paper on Daryabadi which was titled Moulana Abdul Majid Daryabadi ki ilmi wa adabi khidmath. Shah Waliullah Institute, Delhi and National Council for the Promotion of Urdu Language (NCPUL) jointly organised a national seminar on the life and services of Abdul Majid Daryabadi on 15 January 2005 at Rajinder Bhawan, New Delhi. Akhlaqur Rahman Kidwai, governor of Haryana presided over the seminar. The participants presented 17 scholarly papers on different aspects of his life and services. AMU Old Boys Association and Sidq Foundation jointly organised a seminar named, "Urdu Journalism & Maulana Abdul Majid Daryabadi" on 20 March 2022 at the Islamic Centre of India, Aishbagh, Lucknow.

See also 
 Bibliography of Abdul Majid Daryabadi

References

External links 

Abdul Majid Daryabadi
Deobandis
Disciples of Ashraf Ali Thanwi
1892 births
1977 deaths
Writers from Uttar Pradesh
20th-century Indian Muslims
Hanafis
Maturidis
Asharis
People from Barabanki, Uttar Pradesh
Translators of the Quran into English
20th-century Indian translators
Converts to Islam from atheism or agnosticism
Indian Islamists
Indian Sunni Muslim scholars of Islam
20th-century Indian philosophers
Urdu-language writers
20th-century Muslim scholars of Islam
Indian Islamic religious leaders
Islam in India
Founders of Indian schools and colleges
Muslim reformers
Mujaddid
Indian magazine founders
Quranic exegesis scholars